The Eagle Vista name has been used on two subcompact cars sold from 1988 to 1992 in Canada. Along with the Eagle Summit, the car replaced the Renault Encore because of Renault's withdrawing from the United States and Canada at that time. It was a rebadged version of the second generation Mitsubishi Mirage (station wagons were rebadged Mitsubishi Space Wagons). The Vista hatchback and sedans were available with either a 1.5 L 4G15 straight-4, or a 1.6L turbocharged 4G32, and was available with either a 4 or 5-speed manual or a 3-speed automatic transmission. The turbo hatchback came in the GT equipment level, turbo sedans were called LX and carried taller gearing. Turbos were not available with the 4-speed transmission. Hatchbacks and sedans were replaced by the Eagle Summit.

Vista Wagon

The station wagon was available with a SOHC 4G63 2.0L inline four, with either a 5-speed manual transmission (available only on the 4WD version) or a 3-speed automatic. The Eagle Vista was discontinued in 1992, with the wagon replaced by the Eagle Summit minivan (based on the Mitsubishi RVR).

References

Vista
Cars of Canada
Compact cars
Front-wheel-drive vehicles
Cars introduced in 1988
1990s cars
Cars discontinued in 1992